80th meridian may refer to:

80th meridian east, a line of longitude east of the Greenwich Meridian
80th meridian west, a line of longitude west of the Greenwich Meridian